The Ron Lapointe Trophy is awarded annually by the Quebec Major Junior Hockey League to the "Coach of the Year." The award is named for  Ron Lapointe.

Winners
List of "Coach of the Year" winners. Winners in bold also won the Brian Kilrea Coach of the Year Award.

See also
 Brian Kilrea Coach of the Year Award

External links
 QMJHL official site List of trophy winners.

Quebec Major Junior Hockey League trophies and awards
Canada 3